Staronadezhdino is a rural locality (a selo) and the administrative centre of Staronadezhdinsky Selsoviet, Blagoveshchensky District, Bashkortostan, Russia. The population was 525 as of 2010. There are 4 streets.

Geography 
It is located 54 km northeast of Blagoveshchensk.

References 

Rural localities in Blagoveshchensky District
Ufa Governorate